Stock car racing events in the NASCAR Xfinity Series has been held at Darlington Raceway in Darlington, South Carolina since the series' inaugural season in 1982. Currently, the track holds two races in the spring (as companion to Rebel 400) named Shriners Children’s 200 and fall (as companion to Southern 500) named Sport Clips Haircuts VFW 200, both being  in distance. 

Initially only one race was held, but starting in 1984 the track hosted two races per year until 2004 when the track lost its fall weekend date as a result of the realignments caused by the Ferko lawsuit. A realignment in 2015 moved the spring race to the pre-Ferko fall slot. The emergency schedule realignment for 2020 resulted in Darlington regaining its second Xfinity date, which became permanent starting from 2021.

Past winners

1994 Fall and 2002 Fall: Race shortened due to rain.
2003 Spring: Race postponed from Saturday to Monday due to rain.
2008, 2009, 2012, 2017 and both 2021 races: Races extended due to NASCAR overtime.
2019: Cole Custer declared winner after Denny Hamlin was disqualified due to failing inspection.
2020 Spring: Race added due to the COVID-19 pandemic schedule changes; postponed from Tuesday to Thursday due to rain.

Multiple winners (drivers)

Multiple winners (teams)

Manufacturer wins

References

External links
 

1982 establishments in South Carolina
NASCAR Xfinity Series races
NASCAR races at Darlington Raceway
Recurring sporting events established in 1982
Annual sporting events in the United States